The page List of Archibald Prize winners provides a summary of Archibald Prize winners.
This page provides directions to Lists of finalists of the annual Australian Archibald Prize for portraiture.

Lists of finalists

1920s
List of Archibald Prize 1921 finalists
List of Archibald Prize 1922 finalists
List of Archibald Prize 1923 finalists
List of Archibald Prize 1924 finalists
List of Archibald Prize 1925 finalists
List of Archibald Prize 1926 finalists
1930s
List of Archibald Prize 1938 finalists
List of Archibald Prize 1939 finalists
1940s
List of Archibald Prize 1946 finalists
1950s
1960s
List of Archibald Prize 1960 finalists
List of Archibald Prize 1966 finalists
1970s
List of Archibald Prize 1973 finalists
1980s
List of Archibald Prize 1986 finalists
1990s
List of Archibald Prize 1990 finalists
List of Archibald Prize 1991/92 finalists
List of Archibald Prize 1993 finalists
List of Archibald Prize 1994 finalists
List of Archibald Prize 1995 finalists
List of Archibald Prize 1996 finalists
List of Archibald Prize 1997 finalists
List of Archibald Prize 1998 finalists
List of Archibald Prize 1999 finalists
2000s
List of Archibald Prize 2000 finalists
List of Archibald Prize 2001 finalists
List of Archibald Prize 2002 finalists
List of Archibald Prize 2003 finalists
List of Archibald Prize 2004 finalists
List of Archibald Prize 2005 finalists
List of Archibald Prize 2006 finalists
List of Archibald Prize 2007 finalists
List of Archibald Prize 2008 finalists
List of Archibald Prize 2009 finalists
2010s
List of Archibald Prize 2010 finalists
List of Archibald Prize 2011 finalists
List of Archibald Prize 2012 finalists
List of Archibald Prize 2013 finalists
List of Archibald Prize 2014 finalists
List of Archibald Prize 2015 finalists
List of Archibald Prize 2016 finalists
List of Archibald Prize 2017 finalists
List of Archibald Prize 2018 finalists
List of Archibald Prize 2019 finalists
2020s
List of Archibald Prize 2020 finalists
List of Archibald Prize 2021 finalists
List of Archibald Prize 2022 finalists

Notable Archibald artists
There is a number of artists who have been judged finalists more than twenty times. (Many of these have never won the main prize.) These include:
Bill Leak
Keith Looby
Robert Hannaford
L. Scott Pendlebury
Jenny Sages

Notable subjects

Besides the winners, there have been many hundreds of Archibald finalists featuring portraits of Australian celebrities, including musicians, athletes, politicians, film-makers and artists. Some selected ones: (listed Artist – Subject)

 1979
 Lance Bressow – Dame Joan Sutherland
 Josonia Palaitis – The Honourable John Howard, M.P.
 L. Scott Pendlebury – Anne and Drew Pendlebury (Actress and Musician respectively)

 1980
 Charles William Bush – Sir John Kerr
 1981
 William Dargie – Joh Bjelke-Petersen
 1982
 Rex Dupain – Max's Muse (Max Dupain)
 Geoff La Gerche – Patrick White
 Ted Markstein – The Great White Hope in the Land of the Blind (Patrick White)
 1983
 Wesley Walters – Molly
 1984
 Keith Looby – Max Gillies
 Wesley Walters – Portrait of Colleen McCullough
 1985
 Susan Rothwell – Peter Weir
 1986
 Naomi Berns – David Williamson
 Fred Cress – David Armstrong
 1987
 Keith Looby – Manning Clark
 1988
 Leeka Gruzdeff – Don Burrows
 Sidney Nolan – Arthur Boyd at Fitzroy Falls
 1989
 Tim Harris – The Doug Anthony All Stars with the Risen Elvis 
 Bernd Heinrich – Thomas Keneally
 Bill Leak – Sir Donald Bradman
 Brett Whiteley – Portrait of Francis Bacon

 1990
 Glenda Jones – Kaz Cooke
 1991/1992
 Vladas Meskenas – Dr Victor Chang
 Rosemary Valadon – The Long Afternoon – Portrait of Dr Germaine Greer

References

External links 
 
 Art Prizes Database at the Art Gallery of New South Wales
Lists of Finalists:
1920s:             
 1921;
 1922;
 1923;
 1924;
 1925;
 1926;
 1927;
 1928;
 1929
1930s:
 1930;
 1931;
 1932;
 1933;
 1934;
 1935;
 1936;
 1937;
 1938;
 1939
1940s:
 1940;
 1941;
 1942;
 1943;
 1944;
 1945;
 1946;
 1947;
 1948;
 1949
1950s:
 1950;
 1951;
 1952;
 1953;
 1954;
 1955;
 1956;
 1957;
 1958;
 1959
1960s: 
 1960;
 1961;
 1962;
 1963;
 1964;
 1965;
 1966;
 1967;
 1968;
 1969
1970s:
 1970;
 1971;
 1972;
 1973;
 1974;
 1975;
 1976;
 1977;
 1978;
 1979
1980s:
 1980;
 1981;
 1982;
 1983;
 1984;
 1985;
 1986;
 1987;
 1988;
 1989
1990s:
 1990;
     1991/92;    
 1993;
 1994;
 1995;
 1996;
 1997;
 1998;
 1999
2000s:
 2000;
 2001;
 2002;
 2003;
 2004;
 2005;
 2006;
 2007;
 2008;
 2009
2010s:
 2010;
 2011;
 2012;
 2013;
 2014;
 2015;
 2016;
 2017;
 2018; 
 2019
2020s:
 2020;
 2021;
 2022

Portrait art
Lists of artists